Roberts-Smith is a double-barrelled surname.  It may refer to:

Ben Roberts-Smith (born 1978), Australian soldier and businessman
Sam Roberts-Smith (born 1985), Australian opera singer
Len Roberts-Smith (born 1946), Australian judge

See also
Robert Smith (disambiguation)